Billstedt is a quarter in the borough Hamburg-Mitte, in the eastern part of Hamburg, Germany. In 2020, the population was 71,077, it was the second-most populous quarter.

History

Schifbeck, Öjendorf, Steinbeck and Schlem are the old settlements.

Geography
In 2006, according to the statistical office of Hamburg and Schleswig-Holstein, the Billstedt quarter had a total area of 17 km². To the north is the Jenfeld quarter of the Wandsbek borough. The municipalities Barsbüttel and Oststeinbek in the German state Schleswig-Holstein are to the east. To the west are the quarters Horn and Billbrook, to the south is the Lohbrügge quarter of the Bergedorf borough. In the east of Billstedt is the place Mümmelmannsberg.

Demographics
In 2007, the population of the Billstedt quarter was 68,936. In 1999, there were 32,336 households, 39% of which were single individuals. The average household size was 2.14.

Population by year

In 2007 there were 9,626 criminal offences (140/1000 people).

Education

In 2006, there were 10 elementary schools and 6 secondary schools in the Billstedt quarter with 3,894 pupils.

Politics
These are the results of Billstedt in the Hamburg state election:

Infrastructure

Health systems
In 2007, there were 36 day-care centers for children, 84 physicians in private practices and 12 pharmacies.

Transportation
The Bundesautobahn 1 motorway and the Bundesstrasse 5 road run through the quarter. Billstedt is served by the rapid transit system of the underground railway and has several stations on lines U2 and U4.

According to Department of Motor Vehicles (Kraftfahrt-Bundesamt) figures for 2007, 19,998 private cars (290 cars/1000 people) were registered in Billstedt, and 258 traffic accidents occurred.

Recreation
Located in the part Öjendorf is the lake Öjendorfer See.

Notes

References

 Statistical office Hamburg and Schleswig-Holstein Statistisches Amt für Hamburg und Schleswig-Holstein, official website

External links

Quarters of Hamburg
Hamburg-Mitte